Yahcuroo Roemer (born 22 July 2001) is a Dutch professional footballer who plays as a winger for Eerste Divisie club VVV-Venlo.

Career
Roemer was born in Amsterdam, Netherlands, but moved with his mother to Limburg as a three-year-old after his parents divorced. He progressed through the VVV-Venlo youth academy, and was promoted to the first team ahead of the 2018–19 season. Aged 17, he made his professional debut for VVV on 25 September 2018, coming on as a substitute for Patrick Joosten in a 3–0 win over Westlandia in the KNVB Cup.

On 3 April 2020, Roemer signed his first professional contract with VVV, a two-year deal with an option of an additional year. Roemer made his Eredivisie debut for VVV-Venlo on 24 October 2020 as a late substitute in a historic 13–0 home loss to Ajax.

Roemer made his breakthrough for VVV in the 2021–22 season, their first season after relegation to the Eerste Divisie. On 30 November 2021, he signed a contract extension with VVV until 2024, with an option for an extra year. Upon signing, technical director Stan Valckx stated: "Yahcuroo … has earned this contract and we naturally hope that he will continue to develop in the coming years and become even more important for VVV."

Personal life
Born in the Netherlands, Roemer is of Surinamese descent.

Career statistics

References

External links

2001 births
Living people
Dutch footballers
Dutch sportspeople of Surinamese descent
Association football wingers
Eredivisie players
Eerste Divisie players
VVV-Venlo players
Footballers from Amsterdam